Pertamina Central Hospital (abbreviated as RSPP) is a state owned hospital located in Jakarta, Indonesia. It is one of the largest and best-equipped hospitals in the country, and was opened in January 1972 as a major project of the Suharto regime. It is managed by Pertamina Bina Medika (branded as Indonesia Healthcare Corporation), a subsidiary of the state-owned oil company Pertamina.

References

External links
 Rumah Sakit Pusat Pertamina official website (in Indonesian)

Hospitals in Jakarta
1972 establishments in Indonesia
Pertamina